Three Forks is a location in Apache County, Arizona where three forks of the Black River converge.

The Three Forks springsnail is found exclusively there. The species is endangered and the Three Forks area has consequently been declared a critical habitat.

A Civilian Conservation Corps camp was established at Three Forks in 1932.

References

Geography of Apache County, Arizona